Pulse 2 EP is an EP released by The Future Sound of London partly under the alias' Indo Tribe, Smart Systems and FSOL. The FSOL tracks "Stolen Documents" and "In 8" would later be put on the Accelerator album with "In 8" becoming "1 in 8".

Track listing
 Stolen Documents (Jazz Dub) - FSOL
 Producer - Luco
 Zip Code (Stress Ball Mix) - Smart Systems
 Producer - Mental Cube
 In 8 (W-O-W Mix) - FSOL
 Producer - Mental Cube
 I've Become What You Were (Insider Mix) - Indo Tribe
 Producer - Mental Cube

Crew
Written By Brian Dougans, Garry Cobain

References

External links
 

1991 EPs
The Future Sound of London EPs